Allyn A. "Sonny" Holland (March 22, 1938 – December 3, 2022) was an American football player and coach. He was the head coach at his alma mater, Montana State University in Bozeman, from 1971 to 1977. Holland led the Bobcats to two Big Sky titles (1972, 1976) and the Division II playoffs in 1976, where they won all three postseason games and were national champions.

Personal life and death
A native of Butte, Holland graduated from Butte High School and was a lineman at Montana State from 1956 to 1959, where he was a small college All-American at center., 

Holland was an assistant coach under Jim Sweeney at Montana State and then was head coach at Charles M. Russell High School in Great Falls for three seasons (1965–67).
He rejoined Sweeney for a year at Washington State in Pullman, then was the head coach Western Montana College in Dillon in 1969. Holland returned to Bozeman in 1970 as the Bobcats' defensive line coach under Tom Parac, then was promoted to head coach after the season.

At age 39, Holland stepped down as the Montana State head coach in November 1977, and was succeeded by Sonny Lubick. The spring football game at Montana State is named for Holland and a bronze statue of him was unveiled at Bobcat Stadium in September 2016.

Holland died on December 3, 2022, at the age of 84, after suffering from Parkinson's disease.

Head coaching record

College

References

1938 births
2022 deaths
American football centers
Montana State Bobcats football coaches
Montana State Bobcats football players
Montana Western Bulldogs football coaches
Washington State Cougars football coaches
High school football coaches in Montana
Sportspeople from Butte, Montana
Coaches of American football from Montana
Players of American football from Montana
Deaths from Parkinson's disease